Kurt Walter Tidd (born March 26, 1956) is a retired United States Navy admiral. He last served as the Commander, United States Southern Command. Prior to that assignment, Tidd served as Assistant to the Chairman of the Joint Chiefs of Staff. He also served as the Director for Operations, Joint Staff (J-3) from 2012 to 2013, and as Commander, United States Naval Forces Southern Command and United States Fourth Fleet from August 5, 2011 to June 22, 2012. Confirmed by the Senate on December 16, 2015, Tidd received his fourth star and succeeded John F. Kelly as commander of United States Southern Command on January 14, 2016. Tidd held the title of "Old salt", which means he received his qualification for Surface Warfare before any other active-duty navy officer. He passed said title to Admiral Philip S. Davidson upon his retirement. Upon the May 30, 2018, retirement of his United States Naval Academy classmate, Admiral Harry B. Harris Jr., Tidd also gained the honorific of "Old Goat" – the longest-serving Naval Academy graduate on active duty. Harris presented Tidd with the Old Goat decanter in a ceremony on April 11, 2018.

Early life and education
Tidd was born on March 26, 1956 in Honolulu, Hawaii. He is a second-generation surface warfare officer. He is the son of Vice Admiral Emmett H. Tidd, who was the commander of all naval surface forces in the Pacific during the Vietnam War and his brother, Rear Admiral Mark L. Tidd, was the 25th Chief of Navy Chaplains. Tidd grew up in various cities on the East and West coasts before graduating in 1974 from the Porter-Gaud School in Charleston, South Carolina. Tidd was commissioned from the United States Naval Academy in 1978 with a Bachelor of Science in Foreign Area Studies.

Naval career

Tidd was appointed Director of Strategic Capabilities Policy, Defense Policy Directorate in July 2006. He joined the National Security Council staff in March 2005 as Director for Strategy and Defense Issues, Directorate of Combating Terrorism. His responsibilities included developing and coordinating inter-agency policy on countering weapons of mass destruction terrorism, threats to international aviation security, and maritime security policy. From January 2004 to March 2005, Tidd commanded Persian Gulf maritime War on Terror operations as Commander, Middle East Force and Commander Task Force 55.

Tidd was the founding Deputy for Operations on the Chief of Naval Operations War on Terrorism Operations Planning Group Deep Blue. Prior to that, he was the Assistant Chief of Staff for Operations (N-3) to Commander, United States Naval Forces Central Command and Commander, United States Fifth Fleet in Manama, Bahrain. He served in NATO Headquarters, Brussels, Belgium as aide to the U.S. Representative, NATO Military Committee. In The Pentagon, he worked on the Navy Staff in the Strategy and Policy Division (N-51), and as the Political-Military Analyst in the Secretary of the Navy's Office of Program Appraisal. Tidd also was the Strategic Planner on the Chief of Naval Operations' Executive Panel (N-00K).
Tidd was executive officer in USS Leftwich (DD-984), commanding officer, USS Arthur W. Radford (DD-968), and Commander, Destroyer Squadron 50.

Tidd holds a master's degree in political science from the University of Bordeaux, France, earned as an Olmsted Foundation Scholar. He is a graduate of the Armed Forces Staff College, and was a Federal Executive Fellow at the Atlantic Council of the United States. He is a French linguist and a subspecialist in Strategic Planning and Europe/Russia area studies.

Awards and decorations

References

1956 births
Living people
United States Navy admirals
United States Naval Academy alumni
People from Honolulu
Military personnel from Hawaii
Recipients of the Defense Distinguished Service Medal
Recipients of the Navy Distinguished Service Medal
Recipients of the Defense Superior Service Medal
Recipients of the Legion of Merit